Windom Mill Farm is a historic farm and national historic district located at Manor Township, Lancaster County, Pennsylvania. The district includes 12 contributing buildings and 1 contributing site.  They are the main farmhouse, a stone end Pennsylvania bank barn (c. 1800), a mill (1810), the miller's house, a former tavern now a dwelling (c. 1810), two tobacco sheds (c. 1890, c. 1900), a frame corn barn (c. 1890), a garage (c. 1945), a milk house (c. 1890), a pigpen (c. 1890), and a former carriage house (c. 1890).  The contributing site is the remains of the family cemetery.  The farmhouse was built about 1780, and is a 2 1/2-story, five bay by two bay, limestone dwelling with a full-width front porch.  It is in the Federal style.

It was listed on the National Register of Historic Places in 1994.

References

Farms on the National Register of Historic Places in Pennsylvania
Historic districts on the National Register of Historic Places in Pennsylvania
Federal architecture in Pennsylvania
Houses completed in 1780
Houses in Lancaster County, Pennsylvania
National Register of Historic Places in Lancaster County, Pennsylvania